The Rachel Marie is a , 172 passenger passenger-only ferry operating between Skagway and Haines Borough, Alaska.She is owned by Four Seasons Marine and part of the Haines Skagway Fast Ferry fleet.

History
Rachel Marie was built in 1988 along with her sister Melissa Ann at Nichols Boat Builders in Freeland, Washington for the United States Army.  She was later sold to Four Seasons Marie which leased the vessel to Kitsap Transit for a Passenger-Only ferry route between Seattle and Bremerton.

From April 2010 and on, she was operated by the King County Ferry District on the Downtown Seattle to West Seattle route as part of the King County Water Taxi. The route runs all day from April to October each year and in the Peak Hour only the rest of the year. On May 18, 2013, she was replaced by the Spirit of Kingston on the Downtown Seattle to West Seattle route.

Technical Information
The Rachel Marie has a catamaran hull and uses two 900 horsepower propulsion engines to cruise at an average speed of 24 knots. The vessel also is equipped with two radar systems, a GPS plotter, a depth sounder, and an automated information system transponder.

References

Ferries of Washington (state)
Transportation in Kitsap County, Washington
1988 ships
Water transport in Seattle